The 906 K'argop' earthquake took place in the monastery K'argop', Armenia, c. 906. The monastery was also known as Xotakerk', the monastery of the Vegetarians.
The earthquake occurred approximately 150 years following the 735 Vayots Dzor Province earthquake, and affected the same region.

The historian Stephen Orbelian (13th century) mentions the destruction of the church and the whole monastery building of K'argop', which he dates as following the death of "the pious" prince Ashot (possibly Ashot I of Armenia, who died in 890).

In 910, there was correspondence between Queen Šušan and Hovhannes Draskhanakerttsi, Catholicos of All Armenians concerning an ongoing effort to rebuild the church and monastery. The rebuilding concluded in 911.

Surviving remains from the monastery include stone structures, consisting of "squared blocks of stone". The blocks of the external corners are "symmetrically hewed". Also symmetrical are the visible building structures.

References

Sources
 

906
10th-century earthquakes
10th century in Armenia
Vayots Dzor Province
Earthquakes in Armenia